Sophie Jodoin (born 1965) is a Canadian visual artist based in Montreal. Jodoin is known chiefly for her figurative, drawing-based practice in traditional media as well as collage, video, and altered found objects.

Education
She received her Bachelor of Fine Arts in 1988 in Visual Arts from Concordia University in Montreal.

Work
She has worked almost exclusively in black-and-white since 2004, and first showed works integrating drawing and collage in 2009, sourcing images from magazines, the Internet, personal photos and books. In Jodoin's drawing, the lack of objective figures gives people a feeling that there is no narration. One exception that contains didactic intent is "Yesterday and Tomorrow", which consists of a series of drawings. Those pictures showed a young girl wearing a white silk dress walking through a corridor.

Solo exhibitions

 VOLTA NY, New York, NY 2012
 close your eyes, Richmond Art Gallery, Richmond, British-Columbia 2012
 Small Dramas & Little Nothings, Union Gallery, Queens University, Kingston, Ontario 2012
 Small Chronicles of Everyday Violence, Musée d’art de Joliette, Québec. Curated by Marie-Claude Landry 2011
 I felt a cleaving in my mind, Battat Contemporary, Montréal, Québec. Curated by Susannah Wesley 2011
 You have to kill a whole to get a little, Oboro, Montréal, Québec 2011
 Small Dramas & Little Nothings, Invited Artist, Ottawa School of Art, Ontario 2010
 The Cherished Ones, Newzones, Calgary, Alberta 2010
 De peine et de misère, Centre Clark, Montréal, Québec 2010
 Nous sommes en manque, National Center for the Arts - French Theatre, Ottawa, Ontario. Invited by director Wajdi Mouawad 2009
 Headgames: hoods, helmets & gasmasks, Battat Contemporary, Montréal, Québec 2009
 Vigils, Newzones, Calgary, Alberta 2009
 Small Dramas & Little Nothings, Maison des Arts de Laval, Laval, Québec. Curated by Danielle Lord 2009
 Hoods, helmets & gasmasks, Connexion Gallery, organised by UNB Art Centre, Fredericton, New-Brunswick 2008
 Regiment, McClure Gallery, Visual Arts Centre, Montréal, Québec; travelled to Nanaimo Art Gallery, Nanaimo, B.C. (2007)
 Edward Day Gallery, Toronto, Ontario (2007)
 Diary of K.; a journal of drawings (part II), Newzones, Calgary, Alberta 2005
 Diary of K.; a journal of drawings (part I), Edward Day Gallery, Toronto, Ontario 2005
 Drawing Shadows; portraits of my mother, Edward Day Gallery, Toronto, Ontario 2004
 Figures Undressing, Edward Day Gallery, Toronto, Ontario 2003
 Recent Works, Galerie de Bellefeuille, Montréal, Québec 2000
 Architectures, Centre d’exposition des Gouverneurs, Sorel, Québec 1997
 Centre d’exposition l’Imagier, Aylmer, Québec 1996
 Galerie 101, Ottawa, Ontario 1994
 Centre Clark, Montréal, Québec 1992

References

External links
 Official site
 Sophie Jodoin Review
 Newzones
 Sophie Jodoin - The Cherished Ones

1965 births
Artists from Montreal
Canadian women artists
Concordia University alumni
Living people